Parnassius labeyriei  is a high-altitude butterfly which is found in China. It is a member of the snow Apollo genus Parnassius of the swallowtail family, Papilionidae.

The taxonomic status of this butterfly is uncertain. It was described as a separate species and this view was maintained by Chou (1994) and Weiss (1992). Later authors believe it to be conspecific with Parnassius maharaja.

References
Chou, I. (ed) 1994. Monographia Rhopalocerorum Sinensium (Monograph of Chinese Butterflies). Henan Scientific and Technological Publishing House, Zhengzhou.(in Chinese)
Weiss, J.-C. 1992. The Parnassiinae of the World. Part 2. Sciences Nat, Venette; 87 pp.

External links
Parnassius of the World Text and photos.

labeyriei
Butterflies described in 1989